Palau competed in the Olympic Games for the first time at the 2000 Summer Olympics in Sydney, Australia.

Background
Palau is an island country located in the western region of the Caroline Islands, with a population of 21,431 as of July 2017. The nation gained independence in 1994 from the Trust Territory of the Pacific Islands, under the trusteeship of the United States. The two countries also entered the Compact of Free Association that year, allowing the United States to be responsible for Palau's national defense.

The Palau National Olympic Committee was formed in 1997, and it gained full International Olympic Committee (IOC) recognition in June 1999 at the 109th IOC session. Along with Eritrea, the 2000 Olympics were first for the countries. The 2000 Olympics were held from 15 September – 1 October 2000. Palau was part of the torch relay, as the torch stayed in the country on 23 May for one day before heading to the Federated States of Micronesia.

Athletics (track and field)

Palau was represented by athletes Christopher Adolf and Peoria Koshiba for athletics in the 2000 Olympic Games. Adolf competed in the men's 100 meters, and Koshiba competed in the women's 100 meters. Both have previously won their 100 meters in the 1998 Micronesian Games.

In the men's 100 meters, Adolf finished eighth out of nine in fourth heat of the first round, and he did not advance to the next round. Maurice Greene won the event, and Ato Boldon and Obadele Thompson won silver and bronze medals, respectively.

Koshiba competed in the women's 100 meters, where she finished seventh out of eight in the second heat of the first round, and she did not advance to the quarterfinals. Marion Jones later went on to win the event, but she was stripped of her medal after she was found using performance-enhancing drugs.

Men

Women

Swimming

Men

Women

Weightlifting

Women

References

Wallechinsky, David (2004). The Complete Book of the Summer Olympics (Athens 2004 Edition). Toronto, Canada. .

External links
International Olympic Committee (2001). The Results. Retrieved 12 November 2005.
Sydney Organising Committee for the Olympic Games (2001). Official Report of the XXVII Olympiad Volume 1: Preparing for the Games. Retrieved 20 November 2005.
Sydney Organising Committee for the Olympic Games (2001). Official Report of the XXVII Olympiad Volume 2: Celebrating the Games . Retrieved 20 November 2005.
Sydney Organising Committee for the Olympic Games (2001). The Results . Retrieved 20 November 2005.
International Olympic Committee Web Site

Nations at the 2000 Summer Olympics
2000
Olymp